State Route 248 (SR 248) is an east–west secondary state highway located entirely in Williamson County in Middle Tennessee.

History
In the early morning of August 15, 2014, while the road and bridge over Interstate 65 were under construction, a tanker crashed into one of the bridge's support pillars, killing the driver and engulfing the bridge in flames. The bridge was damaged beyond repair and was destroyed on September 20. Construction continued as planned, and the widened bridge was opened to traffic on June 15, 2016.

Route description 
SR 248 begins at an interchange-style junction with U.S. Route 31 (US 31, SR 6) near Thompson’s Station, and goes northeast through rural areas to have an intersection with U.S. Route 431 (US 431, SR 106) before it comes to an end at Interstate 65 (I-65) southeast of Franklin.

After the I-65 junction near the Williamson County Fairgrounds, the road continues as Peytonsville Road, a locally maintained thoroughfare connecting the interchange with the town of Peytonsville and I-840.

Major intersections

References 

248
248